Misserghin is a city in Boutlélis District, Oran Province, Algeria. Its territory is mainly covered by a salt lake called the Sebkha of Oran. 
In city, the known fruit clementine were discovered by Father Clément Rodier in 1892.

Dr. Chérif Sid Cara, one of the few Algerian Muslims who supported the French generals' putsch in April 1961, was the last mayor of Misserghin under French rule.

References

Communes of Oran Province
Algeria